The Our Lady of Assumption Parish Church (Sp., Iglesia Parroquial de Nuestra Señora de la Asuncion), commonly known as the Bulakan Church, is a 19th-century Neo-Byzantine-Romanesque stone church located at Brgy. San Jose, in the Municipality of Bulakan (formerly spelled as Bulacan), Bulacan province, Philippines. It is one of the parishes of the Roman Catholic Diocese of Malolos under the Vicariate of the Immaculate Conception.  The church was declared Marked Historical Structure of the Philippines in 2007 by the National Historical Institute, the precursor of the National Historical Commission of the Philippines. A historical marker bearing a brief history of the church was installed by the commission.

History

Parish church
The parish and the first church was established by the Augustinian Fathers in 1575 as a sub-parish of Tondo.  In 1578, the town of Bulakan was proclaimed a separate parish from Tondo.  According to the historical marker, during the British invasion in 1762 the Bulakan Church was razed by fire.  The construction of the present church and convent was started in 1812 by Father Gaspar Folgar, OSA. The church had sustained damages due to various natural calamities: earthquakes on June 3, 1863; October 1, 1869; and the Luzon earthquakes of 1880, which heavily damaged structures not only Bulakan town but most of Luzon Island.

The church was subsequently repaired after experiencing damages: major repairs on the earthquake-damaged bell tower in 1877 by Father Marcos Hernandez, OSA (through the planning and construction of Don Ramon Hermosa and Don Jose Fuentes – a plaque commemorating the builders of the tower can be seen at the first level of the bell tower façade); and in 1884 when Father Francisco Valdes, OSA rebuilt the church after the 1880 earthquake. The present style of the church can be attributed to his repairs. Finally, Father Patricio Martin, OSA finished the restoration of the church in 1885, with Father Domingo de la Prieta finishing the bell tower’s restoration in 1889.

The church is the site where Filipino general Gregorio del Pilar secretly distributed the pamphlets made by his uncle, Marcelo H. del Pilar, a prominent member of the Propaganda Movement during the late 1800s.

Architectural history
The following list summarizes the priests who managed the parish and made significant changes to the church structure during the Spanish occupation of the Philippines:

 Fr. Gaspar Folgar - He rebuilt the church and convent in 1812.
 Fr. Marcos Hernandez - During his term the construction of a new bell tower started in 1877. The previous tower tilted after the earthquake of 1869.  The new tower was designed by Ramon Hermosa and constructed by Jose Maria Fuentes, both from the Civil Engineers Corps (Cuerpo de ingenieros civiles).
 Fr. Francisco Valdes - He rebuilt the church in a Neo-Byzantine Romanesque style starting in 1884 after it was damaged by the earthquake of 1880.
 Fr. Patricio Martin -  He finished the restoration work in 1885.
 Fr. Domingo de la Prieta - The bell tower was completed in 1889 during his term.

Architectural features

The whole facade stands on a base block, or a plinth. Although it has been in accordance to Neo-Classical Style during the late 1800s, the church has incorporated a mixture of architectural styles including:

Romanesque architectural features
 Presence of corbeled arches, found underneath the raking cornice and upper part of the side walls.
 Presence of decorative scrolls, volutes, vines, and floral motifs - carved on the corbeled arches.
 Presence of three niches with statues above the corbeled arches.
 Presence of a rose window above the main doorway.
 Receding planes of the jamb with three orders at the main doorway.
 The upper part of the square pillar is designed with bricks in chevron pattern.

Muslim architectural feature
 Embellishments located at the pediment.

Present condition

After several interventions from the preceding parish priests, Bulakan Church was restored from 1955 up to 1975. During the recent years, relevant changes had been made to the church structure including the replacement of the Mudejar-style main door with one depicting the history of the town and its patron saints done by local artist A. Magtoto.  A new retablo or altarpiece replaced the 1950s altarpiece that resembles the recessed arch on the church's facade.  Major repairs were also done on the bell tower.

Historical marker

The marker installed by the National Historical Commission of the Philippines in 2007 declaring Bulacan Church as a Marked Historical Structure of the Philippines.

Image Gallery

References

Roman Catholic churches in Bulacan
Churches in the Roman Catholic Diocese of Malolos